Brian Aramis Ramírez (born 29 August 2000) is an Argentine footballer who currently plays for Ittihad Kalba.

Career statistics

Club

Notes

References

External links

2000 births
Living people
Argentine footballers
Argentine expatriate footballers
Association football midfielders
UAE Pro League players
Club Atlético Banfield footballers
Hatta Club players
Al-Ittihad Kalba SC players
Expatriate footballers in the United Arab Emirates
Argentine expatriate sportspeople in the United Arab Emirates